Martin Spottl is an American film director, film producer, and screenwriter whose works include Across the Line, a drama set on the US-Mexico Border, and Stones in my Passway: the Robert Johnson Story, a biopic about blues legend Robert Johnson.

References

External links 
 
 

American film directors
American film producers
American male screenwriters
Living people
Year of birth missing (living people)